The men's 3000 metres steeplechase event at the 2000 World Junior Championships in Athletics was held in Santiago, Chile, at Estadio Nacional Julio Martínez Prádanos on 18 and 21 October.

Medalists

Results

Final
21 October

Heats
18 October

Heat 1

Heat 2

Participation
According to an unofficial count, 34 athletes from 25 countries participated in the event.

References

3000 metres steeplechasechase
Steeplechase at the World Athletics U20 Championships